Yutaka Inagawa (b. 23 Feb 1974) is a Japanese artist trained in painting, line drawing, and photography who specialises in exploiting digital photomontage.

Biography 
Born in Tokyo, Japan, he grew up in the Ikebukuro district. In 1997, he graduated first in his class at the Tokyo National University of Fine Arts and Music, then went on to gain a master's degree in fine arts in 2004 from Chelsea College of Art and Design in London, England. Since then he has lived and worked in London.

His art blends the delicate and the grotesque, juxtaposing photographic fragments, line art and painting to produce complex abstract works. His work is inspired by the uneasy lack of harmony between tradition and modernity in the fast-paced, constantly changing urban world. He sees parallels between his work and the way in which his home city, Tokyo, has absorbed western conventions into Japanese culture without any proper synthesis or reconciliation. He builds his organic-looking images from bizarre collections of carefully cut out photographic elements - including machinery, fish, road signs, leaves, weapons, furniture - the everyday alongside the unusual - the threatening with the benign - but skillfully intertwined so that the original forms are almost indiscernible.

Inagawa's work has been on display in numerous exhibitions throughout the world. He was shortlisted for the Celeste Art Prize in both 2006 and 2007.

Exhibitions
1996: "Sanyou-Ten", Myu Gallery, Kanda, Tokyo, Japan
2004: XHIBIT 04, The Arts Gallery, London
2004: MA fine art show, Chelsea College of Art and Design
2005: Galerie Suty, Coye-la-Forêt, France
2005: St'Art, Strasbourg Art Fair, Strasbourg, France
2005: "Hybrid", Style Cube Zandari, Seoul, South Korea
2005: Summer Exhibition 2005, Royal Academy of Arts, London
2006: "Synchro-Tron", Aqffin Gallery, London
2007: New Art Center, New York City
2008: "Cosmopolis", Pippy Houldsworth Gallery, London
2008: "Around the Clock", I-MYU, London
2008: "Nonplace overlay", Bodhi Gallery, London
2009: "Sensory Cocktails", Gallery Zandari, Seoul, Korea
2009: "Crazytokyo", Galerie Suty, France
2013: "Slow Life: Generation in Exchanges", Yachiyono Oka Museum of Art, Akitakata, Hiroshima
2016: "OTAK JEPUN", Lorong Kekabu, Kuala Lumpur
2014–15: "Yutaka Inagawa: The Invasion of Cyberspace", curated by Christina Mitrentse, Unit 24 Gallery, London
2017–18: "Floating Urban Slime/Sublime", presented and directed by Yutaka Inagawa, Art Gallery Miyauchi, Hiroshima

External links

References

Japanese artists
Living people
People from Tokyo
University of Tokyo alumni
1974 births